Susan MacTavish Best is the founder and CEO of Living MacTavish, a lifestyle business. She was previously the founder of Best Public Relations. She has become known for hosting salon-style dinner parties in San Francisco and New York.

Early life and education 
MacTavish Best's mother is Laurie MacTavish Best and her father is the Canadian scientist and politician Charles Alexander Best. She is the granddaughter of Charles Best, the co-discoverer of insulin.

She attended St Leonards boarding school in St Andrews, Fife. She graduated from Hamilton College with a bachelor's degree in History. She spent one year at Oxford University.

Career 
MacTavish Best created and edited POSTHOC, an online guide to San Francisco, after studying at night school at San Francisco State University’s Multimedia Center.

MacTavish Best founded Best Public Relations in 1998. The company has focused on working with startups, and has worked with clients such as Craigslist, Esurance and Playfish. She was also an executive producer of craigslistTV, a documentary TV series spawned by craigslist. While representing Best Public Relations MacTavish Best featured as a boss on the show "Beat the Boss USA" in an episode entitled "Dog Outfit", which aired in 2009.

In November 2013, MacTavish Best opened up a pop-up shop called "Living MacTavish" SoHo, New York City, with all of the contents of her California home. In the evening, she hosted informal salons, concerts and discussions while serving dinner for the attendees.

MacTavish Best has also held poetry evenings in association with the Poetry Society of America. Former interviewees and speakers at MacTavish Best's events include Oren Yakobovich, Robert Lustig, and Ken Goldberg. In 2018 she was named one of America's Top 100 Party Hosts by The Salonniere website.

Personal life 
MacTavish Best spends time in San Francisco, New York and Point Lobos, Carmel. In 2009, she was badly burned in a fire accident at her San Francisco apartment.

References 

American socialites
People educated at St Leonards School
Living people
Year of birth missing (living people)